Nasreen Jahan Ratna (born 8 August 1963) is a Bangladesh Jaitya Party politician and a Member of Bangladesh Parliament from Barisal-6 since 2014.

Biography
Ratna was educated at home and did not receive formal education. She is from Barisal City. She was elected chairperson of Bakerganj municipality in May 2004. Her nomination from Barisal-6 was cancelled by the Bangladesh Election Commission for the elections scheduled to take place in 2006. She appealed the decision of the commission on 20 December 2006. Hossain Mohammad Ershad, the chairman of the Jatiya Party, selected her for the Jatiya Party candidate for the general election. In 2009, she was selected to Parliament from one of forty-five reserved seats for women candidates as a member of Jatiya Party. She was elected to Parliament in 2014 from Barisal-6. She was also a member of the Parliamentary Standing Committee on Ministry of Women and Children Affairs.

Controversy
Ratna waded into controversy after she opened a bazaar named after Sadek Ali Howlader in Badarganj municipality on 25 August 2009. Sadek Ali Howlader was a member of the Pro Pakistani Rajakar militia and allegedly committed war crimes during the Bangladesh Liberation war. He allegedly committed acts of violence against the Hindu community and the market was built upon land grabbed from Hindu people.

Personal life
Ratna is married to ABM Ruhul Amin Howlader. Her husband is the Co-Chairman of Jatiya Party and former member of Parliament from Jatiya Party.

References

Living people
1963 births
People from Barisal District
Jatiya Party politicians
Women members of the Jatiya Sangsad
10th Jatiya Sangsad members
11th Jatiya Sangsad members
21st-century Bangladeshi women politicians